Miami Intermodal Center (MIC) is an intermodal rapid transit, commuter rail, intercity rail, local bus, and intercity bus transportation hub in Miami-Dade County, Florida, just outside the Miami city limits near the Grapeland Heights neighborhood. The facility was constructed by the Florida Department of Transportation and is owned by the Miami-Dade Expressway Authority.

The MIC is located on Northwest 21st Street near North Douglas Road (West 37th Avenue), east of Le Jeune Road (West 42nd Avenue) and Miami International Airport (MIA), and south of the Miami River and the Airport Expressway (SR 112). It is currently served by Tri-Rail, Metrorail, the MIA Mover, Metrobus, Greyhound Lines, and may possibly be served by Amtrak in the future. The station portion of the MIC is signed as Miami International Airport on Metrorail and Miami Airport Station on Tri-Rail. It would appear as "Miami" on Amtrak timetables.

The MIC's rental car center (RCC) opened on July 13, 2010. The MIA Mover began to operate at the MIC on September 9, 2011, followed by Metrorail on July 28, 2012; Tri-Rail on April 5, 2015; and Greyhound on June 24, 2015. Amtrak service has been delayed because the platforms were constructed to insufficient length. Service was expected to begin in Fall 2016, but continues to be postponed amid ongoing lease negotiations between Amtrak and the Florida Department of Transportation (FDOT). Brightline has expressed interest in serving at the facility where Amtrak plans to relocate its service, but no negotiations are currently underway, according to FDOT.

History

Previous stations

When Amtrak took over intercity passenger service in May 1971, it continued to use the former Seaboard Air Line Railroad (SAL) station on NW 7th Avenue in Allapattah, two miles north of downtown. The SAL station, built in 1930, was already showing its age. On May 13, 1977, Amtrak began construction of a new station near the SAL's Hialeah Yards. It opened on June 20, 1978.

Southbound Tri-Rail service terminated at the modern-day Hialeah Market upon the line's opening on January 1, 1989. A new Miami Airport station opened in April 1998 at the present site of the Miami Intermodal Center (MIC). The Miami Airport station was the southern terminus of the Tri-Rail system between April 1998 and September 12, 2011, when service was cut back to Hialeah Market for approximately three years to facilitate construction of the new station.

Metrorail opened its first line in 1984 and 1985; due to higher than expected costs, other planned lines (including a line to the airport) were not immediately pursued. The Tri-Rail and Metrorail Transfer Station opened on March 6, 1989, providing a connection between the two lines. The station is several blocks away from the 1978-built Amtrak station, with no direct connection.

Planning
In 1989, the Miami International Airport Area Transportation Study recommended the booming Miami metropolitan area invest in an intermodal hub to connect the new rapid transit and commuter rail services to local and intercity bus routes at the airport. The Intermodal Surface Transportation Efficiency Act of 1991, which gave additional powers to regional agencies and emphasized non-auto modes, prompted FDOT to move forward with the proposal.

In mid-1993, FDOT and six United States Department of Transportation (USDOT) subsidiary agencies created the Miami Intermodal Center project, with FDOT as lead agency. The Major Investment Study/Draft Environmental Impact Statement was approved by the Federal Highway Administration in 1995. Miami-Dade County approved the project and added it to the county's long-term transportation plan in 1996. The Preliminary Engineering and Final Environmental Impact Statement was submitted in December 1997. A Record of Decision was received from the USDOT on May 5, 1998.

The Transportation Equity Act for the 21st Century was passed in 1998, continuing support for intermodal projects. The connected Transportation Infrastructure Finance and Innovation Act of 1998 allowed projects of regional or national significance to apply for federal funding. The MIC was approved for up to $433 million in such TIFIA loans in 1999, with the first $269 million granted on June 9, 2000, allowing the rental car center (RCC) component to advance. FDOT signed agreements with the South Florida Regional Transportation Authority (operator of Tri-Rail), Miami-Dade County and the Miami-Dade Expressway Authority the same year. In 2003, it was determined that the MIC would include only ground transportation services, with no airport functions being relocated.

In 2002, Miami-Dade County approved a public referendum for a half-cent sales tax to support transportation expansion in the region. The tax was to fund an increase in bus service, plus two Metrorail branches: Orange Line North to 215th Street, and Orange Line West to Florida International University via the MIC. A previous attempt at a one-cent sales tax had been defeated in 1999.
The second TIFIA loan, for $170 million, was signed in April 2005. The federal Safe, Accountable, Flexible, Efficient Transportation Equity Act: A Legacy for Users, passed in August 2005, continued funding for the MIC and added $100 million for the  Metrorail branch from Earlington Heights to the MIC. In July 2006, FDOT paid $17.1 million on the first TIFIA loan, converting it to a state loan with a lower rate. In August 2007, an additional $100 million was added to the first TIFIA loan.

The Metrorail expansions funded by the 2002 sales tax were to primarily serve lower density residential areas, causing them to have poor ridership-to-cost projections. Sales tax revenue was hurt by the late-2000s recession, and much of what was collected was instead used to cover operating expenses due to mismanagement and questionable hiring practices in the transit agency. These issues lead the expansions to be ineligible for partial funding by the Federal Transit Administration, and they were effectively canceled in July 2010. The spur to the airport had then completed design and was allowed to continue, although its cost doubled from original projections.

Construction

The first component of the MIC Program to be completed was major roadway improvements. These included a new interchange with direct access from the Dolphin Expressway and the Airport Expressway to the MIC and the airport, reconfiguration of Le Jeune Road as an arterial boulevard (as it no longer was needed to handle most airport traffic), and upgrades to local roads serving the airport area. The second component was the RCC, a  "rental car shopping mall" that provides airport passengers convenient access to participating rental car companies.

Construction of the road portion of the MIC began in 2001, followed by foundation work on the RCC in June 2003. Property and right of way acquisition for the whole project was completed in late 2003. The first column for the RCC was poured in July 2007. The main part of the Roadways Program, including the MIC-MIA Interchange and the Le Jeune Road modifications, were completed on May 16, 2008. The RCC was topped off on September 26, 2008 and opened on July 13, 2010. A shuttle bus ran from the RCC to the airport terminals.

Phase I: Metrorail and MIA Mover

Phase I of the Miami Airport Station consisted of the construction of two connected terminal stations: one for the new Metrorail spur, and one for the MIA Mover, a  elevated people mover line connecting the airport terminals to the MIC. A groundbreaking for the MIA Mover was held on March 1, 2009, followed by one for the Metrorail spur on May 1. After two years of construction the MIA Mover station received a certificate of occupancy in January 2011, allowing final systems to be installed. The MIA Mover opened on September 9, 2011, replacing the shuttle buses.

 
The Metrorail station, covered in a stainless steel and aluminum canopy, has a Metrobus station integrated into its ground level. The structure was manufactured in Kansas City, shipped in modular sections, and assembled on site. Foundations for the Metrorail viaduct were completed in early 2010, with the beams and tracks installed over the rest of the year. By February 2011, the extension was 75% complete, with most of the station structure in place. The bridge over the Miami River was completed in March 2011. Finishes, glass walls, and canopies were installed in the station in mid-2011. Testing of Metrorail trains on the extension began in January 2012. The spur to the MIC opened as the Orange Line on July 28, 2012. The final cost of the Metrorail extension was $506 million, of which $405 million was from sales tax and $101 million from FDOT.

In the first few years, Metrorail ridership was lower than expected, starting below 1,500 daily and increasing to nearly 2,000 daily by 2015-2016, though notably, ridership was almost equally high on weekends, where most stations have about half the ridership on weekends.

Phase II: Amtrak and Tri-Rail

Phase II of Miami Airport Station consisted of mainline rail and intercity bus terminals, connected to the Phase I station complex with a large pedestrian bridge. The facility has two stub-end island platforms, each served by two tracks. Construction of the facility began on May 18, 2011. Tri-Rail's Miami Airport station closed on September 12, 2011 for what was planned to be two years of construction. Hialeah Market station was upgraded with a temporary ticket office, additional parking, and restrooms, with shuttle bus service to the airport. The closure was expected to save $10 million in construction costs. Amid design changes due to financial concerns, a ceremonial groundbreaking took place on September 27.

The platforms can accommodate the nine-to-ten-car trains Amtrak normally uses for the Silver Meteor and Silver Star. However, Amtrak runs longer trains during the winter months that can be up to twelve cars long to accommodate increased passenger demand. In February 2012, Amtrak became aware that the -long platforms, which they had approved over the course of years of design meetings with FDOT, were too short to handle the longer winter season trains, which need  of platform length. 

NW 25th Street is located immediately adjacent to the north end of the station, which prevented easily extending the platforms to accommodate longer trains. When the issue was first communicated to the public in January 2013, three options were under consideration: full closure of the NW 25th Street crossing, a road bridge, or a road tunnel. By that time, FDOT had already begun constructing the platform extensions. By May 2013, closing the road had been nixed due to local objections. Adding a bridge or tunnel for the road, or extending one of the platforms southwards into the station building, was expected to cost from $6 million to $55 million and delay the station's opening by a year. After the decision was made not to close the NW 25th Street crossing, FDOT spent $380,000 to demolish the partially constructed platform extensions. In October 2013, FDOT announced plans for a $9 million solution; the NW 25th Street crossing would remain open but would be blocked by longer winter season trains while they were stopped at the station, which could last up to 45 minutes once or twice a day. To accommodate traffic during extended crossing blockages, FDOT constructed two new roads: an extension of NW 28th Street east across the tracks to Douglas Road (NW 37th Street), and a cut-through from NW 25th to Douglas Road just east of the tracks.

By January 2015, the project was more than a year behind schedule and still not complete. Along with the platform length issues, there was a dispute between FDOT and the contractor over costs; and a dispute between FDOT, the Miami-Dade Expressway Authority, and the Miami-Dade Aviation Department over ownership transfer. At that time, Tri-Rail was expected to begin serving the station within a few months, and Amtrak in Fall 2016. Tri-Rail service was finally re-extended to the MIC on April 5, 2015. Greyhound began using the station on June 24, 2015.

Amtrak had been expected to move to the MIC from Miami station in Hialeah by the Fall of 2016, but in 2018 Amtrak rejected the terms of a lease agreement with FDOT and said it had no plans to move to the MIC. 

In 2021, Amtrak reached out to FDOT to begin negotiations again for utilization of the station, and in February 2022, negotiations restarted between FDOT and Amtrak. Later in March 2022, a test train operated into and out of the station and proved that the platforms are sufficient in length to hold a standard ten-car train. However, the platform cannot fit a train longer than ten cars and two locomotives without blocking NW 25th Street, as the lead locomotive comes up right to the end of the platform. In September 2022, Amtrak management announced that it had restarted lease negotiations with FDOT regarding use and maintenance of the terminal. One issue however, is the deadheading move that will need to take place between the MIC and Hialeah. Amtrak CEO Stephen Gardner has stated that "the company is evaluating technical and operational aspects of the move." In an Amtrak Public Board Meeting Q&A on December 1, 2022, it was revealed that Amtrak is in the final stages of its preparations for relocating from their current Miami station, and plans to officially relocate to the MIC in 2023.

Station layout
Miami Airport is a terminal station for all three services. The MIA Mover automated people mover system transports passengers between this station and airport terminals, departs from the upper level of the station in the southern direction. Metrorail, which provides service Downtown Miami and points south, departs from the upper level in the northern direction. On the ground level, four tracks serve Tri-Rail and possible future Amtrak Silver Service towards Fort Lauderdale, West Palm Beach, and points north. The ground level also has bus bays and a waiting area for Metrobus, Greyhound, and Megabus. The concourse and headhouse were built to accommodate a future third Tri-Rail and Amtrak platform to the east of the existing platforms.

Rental car center

The MIC contains a multi-level consolidated rental car facility, which contains 16 rental car companies. Opened on July 13, 2010, the RCC is home to 6,500 rental cars and is projected to serve 28,000 customers daily. The Quick Turnaround Area where vehicles are washed and refueled includes 120 gas pump positions and 42 car wash bays on three vehicle storage levels. The multi-level fueling system is the first of its kind in the United States.

The consolidation initially cut the combined rental car bus fleet in half from 120 buses to 60. In September 2011, the MIA Mover entirely replaced the shuttle bus service. The elimination of the rental car bus fleet has reduced gas emissions at the airport by 30%.

See also
Orlando International Airport Intermodal Terminal
Transportation in South Florida

References

External links

 (archive)
 (squatted page?)

2012 establishments in Florida
Airport railway stations in the United States
Bus stations in Florida
Metrorail (Miami-Dade County) stations in Miami-Dade County, Florida
Miami International Airport
Miami-Dade Transit
Orange Line (Metrorail)
Railway stations in the United States opened in 2012
Transit centers in the United States
Tri-Rail stations in Miami-Dade County, Florida
Union stations in the United States